Scopula trapezistigma is a moth of the family Geometridae. It was described by Prout in 1938. It is found on Java.

References

Moths described in 1938
trapezistigma
Taxa named by Louis Beethoven Prout
Moths of Indonesia